Lloyd “Snapper” Stein (1907–1987) was a college football player and served as an athletic trainer at The University of Minnesota athletic teams for over 40 years. Stein was a member of the Minnesota Golden Gophers football team from 1928 to 1932, serving as the teams long snapper, earning him the nickname "Snapper." In 1932 he graduated from the University of Minnesota with a bachelor's degree in physical education and became the freshman athletic trainer. In 1935 he became the U of M's head athletic trainer, a position he held until his retirement in 1975. Stein was inducted into the National Athletic Trainers' Association (NATA) Hall of Fame.

References

External links
 Photo of Stein as member of University of Minnesota football team

Minnesota Golden Gophers football players
University of Minnesota alumni
1985 deaths
1907 births
Athletic trainers